Sergio Pardilla Bellón (born 16 January 1984) is a Spanish former professional road cyclist, who competed professionally between 2006 and 2019 for the , , ,  and  teams.

Major results

2005
 3rd Overall Circuito Montañés
1st Stage 4
2006
 Tour de l'Avenir
1st Mountains classification
1st Stage 10
 8th Overall Circuito Montañés
 9th Overall Vuelta a Navarra
2007
 1st Overall Tour des Pyrénées
1st Stage 3
 4th Overall Cinturón a Mallorca
 7th Overall Vuelta a Cuba
 9th Subida a Urkiola
2008
 2nd Overall Vuelta a La Rioja
1st Stage 3
 3rd Prueba Villafranca de Ordizia
 3rd Subida a Urkiola
 4th Overall Cinturón a Mallorca
 4th Clásica a los Puertos de Guadarrama
 5th Overall Cinturó de l'Empordà
 7th Overall Circuito Montañés
 8th Overall Vuelta a Castilla y León
2009
 1st  Overall Tour of Japan
1st Stage 5
 3rd Overall Circuito Montañés
1st Stage 6
 7th Overall Brixia Tour
2010
 1st  Overall Vuelta a la Comunidad de Madrid
1st Stage 3
 2nd Overall Tour of Austria
 3rd Overall Volta a Portugal
 3rd Overall Vuelta a Andalucía
1st Stage 1
 6th Overall Giro del Trentino
 8th Overall Settimana Internazionale di Coppi e Bartali
 10th Giro dell'Appennino
 10th Grand Prix of Aargau Canton
 10th Prueba Villafranca de Ordizia
2011
 7th Overall Brixia Tour
 9th Overall Vuelta a Burgos
1st Stage 3 (TTT)
2012
 1st  Mountains classification Vuelta a Burgos
 2nd Overall Tour de l'Ain
 4th Overall Vuelta a Murcia
 7th Overall Route du Sud
 10th Overall Volta a Catalunya
 10th Overall Tour of Austria
2013
 1st Stage 4 Volta a Portugal
 3rd Overall Tour de Langkawi
 6th Overall Tour of Britain
 9th Overall Settimana Internazionale di Coppi e Bartali
2014
 5th Overall Vuelta a Burgos
 Vuelta a España
Held  after Stage 5
2016
 2nd Overall GP Beiras e Serra da Estrela
 2nd Overall Vuelta a Asturias
 3rd Overall Vuelta a Burgos
1st Stage 5
 3rd Klasika Primavera de Amorebieta
 5th Overall Route du Sud
 7th Overall Vuelta a la Comunidad de Madrid
 9th GP Industria & Artigianato di Larciano
2017
 5th Overall Vuelta a Asturias
 9th Overall Vuelta a la Comunidad de Madrid
 9th Overall GP Beiras e Serra da Estrela
2018
 6th Overall Vuelta a Burgos
 7th Overall Vuelta a Asturias
 10th Overall Vuelta a Aragón

Grand Tour general classification results timeline

References

External links

1984 births
Living people
Spanish male cyclists
Sportspeople from the Province of Ciudad Real
Cyclists from Castilla-La Mancha